The Little Dipper is a constellation also known as Ursa Minor.

Little Dipper may also refer to:

Entertainment
"Little Dipper" (Gravity Falls), a 2012 episode of the animated series Gravity Falls
The Little Dippers, the group later known as the Anita Kerr Singers

Other
Little Dipper, a dalmatian puppy in 102 Dalmatians
Lockheed Little Dipper a single-seat monoplane

Roller coasters
Little Dipper (Memphis Kiddie Park) in Ohio
Little Dipper (Six Flags Great America) in Illinois
Little Dipper (Conneaut Lake Park) in Pennsylvania
Little Dipper (Little Amerricka) in Wisconsin

See also
Big Dipper (disambiguation)